The 2008–09 Slovenian Football Cup was the 18th season of the Slovenian Football Cup, Slovenia's football knockout competition. It started on 2 August 2008 and ended on 30 May 2009 with the final. The defending champions were Interblock, who successfully defended the title by defeating Koper 2–1 in the final.

Qualified clubs

2008–09 Slovenian PrvaLiga members
Celje
Domžale
Drava Ptuj
Gorica
Interblock
Koper
Maribor
Nafta Lendava
Primorje
Rudar Velenje

Additional place: Livar

Qualified through MNZ Regional Cups
MNZ Ljubljana:  Olimpija Ljubljana, Bela Krajina, Krka
MNZ Maribor: Slovenj Gradec, Dravograd, Korotan Prevalje
MNZ Celje: MU Šentjur, Krško
MNZ Koper: Izola, Bonifika
MNZ Nova Gorica: Adria, Idrija
MNZ Murska Sobota: Mura 05, Roma
MNZ Lendava: Črenšovci, Polana
MNZG-Kranj: Šenčur, Velesovo
MNZ Ptuj: Aluminij, Zavrč

First round
In this round entered 19 teams from Slovenian second and third division. Since Izola withdrew from the competition before the beginning, Adria received a bye to the Second Round. The matches were played on 2 and 19 August 2008.

|}

Second round
In this round entered winners from the previous round as well as one team who had received a bye. The matches were played on 3 September 2008.

|}

Round of 16
In this round entered winners from the previous round as well as all teams from the Slovenian PrvaLiga. Livar also entered in the Third Round. They got relegated to the second division at the end of the last year's PrvaLiga. The matches were played on 16 and 17 September 2008.

|}

Quarter-finals
The matches were played on 22 October 2008.

|}

Semi-finals
The first legs were played on 15 April 2009. The second legs were played on 29 April 2009.

|}

Final

References

 

Slovenian Football Cup seasons
Slovenian Cup, 2008-09
Cup